Balázs Tóth (born 29 April 2004) is a Hungarian professional footballer who plays as a goalkeeper for 2. Liga club Liefering.

Personal life
Tóth is the brother of fellow professional footballer Milán Tóth, who plays for the reserve team of Sturm Graz.

Career statistics

Club

Notes

References

2004 births
Living people
People from Ózd
Hungarian footballers
Hungary youth international footballers
Association football goalkeepers
2. Liga (Austria) players
Győri ETO FC players
Szombathelyi Haladás footballers
FC Red Bull Salzburg players
FC Liefering players
Hungarian expatriate footballers
Hungarian expatriate sportspeople in Austria
Expatriate footballers in Austria
Sportspeople from Borsod-Abaúj-Zemplén County